Vi Anand is an Indian film director and screenwriter who primarily works in Telugu cinema. He is an architect turned film maker.

Early life and career
In the year 2008 Anand joined director AR Murugadoss as an assistant director. He made his directorial debut with Hrudayam Ekkadunnadi in 2014. In the same year he made his directorial debut in the Tamil film industry with a sci-fi drama Appuchi Gramam. In the year 2015 he directed the Telugu action entertainer Tiger starring Sundeep Kishan. The film Tiger was very well received by the critics and Anand was noted for the screen writing in the film. After the success of the film Tiger in Telugu Vi Anand went on to write and direct a supernatural romantic thriller Ekkadiki Pothavu Chinnavada which featured Nikhil Siddharth, Hebah Patel, Nandita Swetha and Avika Gor in the lead roles. The film was released on 18 November 2016. Now his most recent directorial outing Okka Kshanam, is a sci fi drama, starring Allu Sirish, Seerat Kapoor, Surbhi. The film deals with a parallel life concept where the protagonist fights against his own destiny, fate and time. The film released worldwide on 28 December 2017 to mixed reviews from critics and audience.

Filmography

References

External links 

 Ekkadiki Pothavu Chinnavada Movie Review: An engaging thriller & an enthralling story. It's a honest narrative delivered well. 3.5/5 Star
 Best Telugu films of 2020
 

Living people
Indian male screenwriters
Telugu screenwriters
Film directors from Tamil Nadu
Telugu film directors
People from Erode district
1979 births